Auramine O is a diarylmethane dye used as a fluorescent stain. In its pure form, Auramine O appears as yellow needle crystals. It is insoluble in water and soluble in ethanol and DMSO.

Auramine O can be used to stain acid-fast bacteria (e.g. Mycobacterium, where it binds to the mycolic acid in its cell wall) in a way similar to Ziehl–Neelsen stain. It can also be used as a fluorescent version of the Schiff reagent.

Auramine O can be used together with Rhodamine B as the Truant auramine-rhodamine stain for Mycobacterium tuberculosis. It can be also used as an antiseptic agent.

References

External links
 Auramine O spectra data

Diarylmethane dyes
Staining dyes
Antiseptics